Sebastián Cruzado Fernández (born 28 February 1965), known as Chano, is a retired Spanish professional footballer who played mainly as an attacking midfielder.

Club career
Chano was born in Huelva, Andalusia. After being definitely promoted to Real Betis' first team for the 1986–87 season, he (who featured in 137 La Liga matches with the club, scoring 11 goals – he also spent one year in the second division) never ceased to be a nuclear midfield element in the following campaigns.

His status as a regular player continued with Chano's 1991 move to CD Tenerife, where he spent eight years, helping to the side's domestic and European consolidations (two UEFA Cup participations). From 1986 to 1997 he never played fewer than 31 league games per season, but only managed 32 appearances in his last two years in Spain combined due to a severe knee condition.

At already 34, Chano moved to Portugal's S.L. Benfica, still managing to have some impact in his two-year spell, after which he retired from football.

International career
On 9 February 1994, Chano earned his sole cap for Spain, as he played the entire friendly match with Poland (1–1) in front of a familiar crowd in Santa Cruz de Tenerife.

References

External links

Betisweb stats and bio 
 

1965 births
Living people
Footballers from Huelva
Spanish footballers
Association football midfielders
La Liga players
Segunda División players
Segunda División B players
Tercera División players
Betis Deportivo Balompié footballers
Real Betis players
CD Tenerife players
Primeira Liga players
S.L. Benfica footballers
Spain international footballers
Spanish expatriate footballers
Expatriate footballers in Portugal
Spanish expatriate sportspeople in Portugal